The 2022 FIBA U18 Women's African Championship was an international under-18 basketball competition that was held in Antsirabe, Madagascar from August 5 to 13.

The tournament, which was also the 16th edition of the biennial competition, will qualify the top two teams to represent FIBA Africa in the 2023 FIBA U19 Women's Basketball World Cup in Spain. This is the first time Madagascar will be hosting the tournament.

 regained the continental championship, and their eighth title overall, after overpowering the defending champions  in the Final, 86–54. Meanwhile,  defeated the hosts  in the Third Place Game, 53–37, to claim their fifth overall Bronze Medal finish.

Qualification

Qualified teams

Includes current world ranking prior to the start of the tournament (in parenthesis).

 Host Nation (1)
  (NR)
 Zone I
  (50)
 Zone II
  (NR)
  (15)
 Zone V
  (59)
  (66)
  (31)
 Zone VI
  (40)

Preliminary round
The draw took place on 3 August 2022.

All times are local (UTC+3).

Group A

Group B

Knockout stage

Bracket

Quarterfinals

5–8th place semifinals

Semifinals

{{Basketballbox|date=11 August 2022|time=17:30|place=Gymnase Vatofotsy, Antsirabe
|teamA=  |scoreA= 67
|teamB=  |scoreB= 36
|Q1= 18–15 |Q2= 16–6 |Q3= 21–3 |Q4= 12–12
|report=Boxscore
|points1= Haidara 22
|rebounds1= Haidara 18
|assist1= Sanou 4
|points2= Joaquim 10
|rebounds2= I. Joao 11
|assist2= Joaquim 2
|referee= Nadege Zouzou (CIV), Walelign Fikadu Gebeto (ETH), Christelle Madjio Libawo (CMR)
}}

Seventh place game

Fifth place game

Third place game

Final

Final standings

 Awards 

All-Tournament Team
 C  Jana Elalfy
 F  Maimouna Haidara (MVP)'''
 F  Isabel Joao
 G  Marion Rasolofoson
 G  Doua Yahiaoui

References

FIBA Africa Under-18 Championship for Women
2022 in African basketball
International basketball competitions hosted by Madagascar
August 2022 sports events in Africa
FIBA